North Medwyn is a river in the Lanarkshire region of Scotland. Along with the confluence of the South Medwyn River it forms the Medwyn water basin. The North Medwyn is a tributary of the River Clyde.

Rivers of South Lanarkshire
River Clyde